This article contains lists of candidates associated with the 2016 Democratic Party presidential primaries for the 2016 United States presidential election.

Major candidates
Individuals included in this section have taken one or more of the following actions: formally announced their candidacy, or filed as a candidate with Federal Election Commission (FEC) (for other than exploratory purposes), and were included in at least 5 independent national polls.

Five of the major candidates were invited to participate in at least one Democratic Party-sanctioned debate: Lincoln Chafee, Hillary Clinton, Martin O'Malley, Bernie Sanders, and Jim Webb.

Nominee

Candidates who won one or more contests
The following candidate won primaries and received delegates in most or all state primaries and caucuses.

Major candidates who withdrew during the primaries
The following individual announced a major candidacy for president but withdrew at some point after the Iowa Caucuses.

Major candidates who withdrew before the primaries
The following individuals were recognized by the media as major candidates for president but withdrew from the race after the first debate. Some received write-in votes. They are listed alphabetically.

Other candidates

On the ballot in multiple states

The following notable individuals were on the ballot in at least five states.

In addition, the following other candidates were on the ballot in more than one state:

Star Locke of Texas, on the ballot in New Hampshire, Texas, and Oklahoma. received a total of 5,201 votes
Steve Burke of New York, on the ballot in New Hampshire and Louisiana, received 4,892 votes.
Henry Hewes of New York, on the ballot in Louisiana, New Hampshire, Arizona, and Missouri, received 3,319 votes
Jon Adams of New York is on the ballot in Missouri and New Hampshire, received 486 votes.
 James Valentine of Miami Beach, Florida, on the ballot in both Arkansas and New Hampshire. received 1,710 votes.
Mark Stewart Greenstein of Connecticut was on the ballot in New Hampshire and Utah.  He received 41 votes.

On ballot in a single state

 Illinois
Lawrence "Larry Joe" Cohen of Illinois (2,407 votes)
David Formhals of Illinois (25 votes)
Brian James O'Neill of Illinois (2 votes)
Sources: Illinois Democrat and Candidates from The Green Papers

 New Hampshire
Vermin Supreme of Maryland; performance artist and perennial candidate (265 votes)
David John Thistle of New Hampshire (223 votes)
Graham Schwass of Massachusetts (142 votes)
Lloyd Kelso of North Carolina (46 votes)
Eric Elbot of Massachusetts (36 votes)
William D. French of Pennsylvania (29 votes)
Raymond Michael Moroz of New York (27 votes)
Edward T. O’Donnell, Jr. of Pennsylvania (26 votes)
Robert Lovitt of Kentucky (21 votes)
William H. McGaughey, Jr. of Minnesota (19 votes)
Edward Sonnino of New York (17 votes)
Sam Sloan of New York; former chess administrator and 2012 Libertarian Party candidate (15 votes)
Brock C. Hutton of Maryland (14 votes)
Steven Roy Lipscomb of New Mexico (14 votes)
Richard Lyons Weil of Colorado (8 votes)
Source: New Hampshire Democrat and Candidates from The Green Papers

 Rhode Island
Mark Stewart of New Hampshire (236 votes)
Source: Rhode Island Democrat and Candidates from The Green Papers

 Texas
Calvis L. Hawes of Texas (2,017 votes)
Source: Texas Democrat and Candidates from The Green Papers

 West Virginia
Paul T. Farrell Jr. of West Virginia; an attorney (21,694 votes)
Source: West Virginia Democrat and Candidates from The Green Papers

Candidates not on any primary ballot
Over a thousand people sent the requisite paperwork to the Federal Election Commission declaring themselves candidates for President.

Among them were the following notable people:

Alternate ballot options
Several primaries provided ballot options to voters to cast votes for "no preference" and/or "uncommitted". "No preference" received 45,331 votes (0.27% of the popular vote), and 'uncommitted' received 40,548 votes (0.24% of the popular vote), respectively placing them 4th and 5th in the popular vote.

Potential candidates who did not run

Previous
The following people were the focus of presidential speculation in multiple media reports during the 2016 election cycle.

 Mike Beebe, Governor of Arkansas 2007–2015; Attorney General of Arkansas 2003–2007
 Steve Beshear, Governor of Kentucky 2007–2015; Lieutenant Governor of Kentucky 1983–1987; Attorney General of Kentucky 1980–1983
 Jerry Brown, Governor of California 2011–2019 and 1975–1983; presidential candidate in 1976, 1980, and 1992
 Steve Bullock, Governor of Montana since 2013; Attorney General of Montana 2009–2013
 Russ Feingold, Nominee for U.S. Senate in 2016; U.S. Special Representative for the African Great Lakes region 2013–2015; U.S. Senator from Wisconsin 1993–2011
 Al Gore, Vice President of the United States 1993–2001; Democratic Party presidential nominee in 2000; U.S. Senator from Tennessee 1985–1993
 Christine Gregoire, Governor of Washington 2005–2013; Attorney General of Washington 1993–2005
 Luis Gutiérrez, U.S. Representative from Illinois 1993–2019; Member of the Chicago City Council 1986–1992
 Kamala Harris, Nominee for U.S. Senate in 2016, Attorney General of California 2011–2017
 Maggie Hassan, Nominee for U.S. Senate in 2016, Governor of New Hampshire 2013–2017
 Gary Locke, United States Ambassador to China 2011–2014; United States Secretary of Commerce 2009–2011; Governor of Washington 1997–2005
 Jack Markell, Governor of Delaware 2009–2017; Treasurer of Delaware 1993–2009
 William H. McRaven, retired Admiral and former Commander of the United States Special Operations Command
 Janet Napolitano, President of the University of California since 2013; U.S. Secretary of Homeland Security 2009–2013; Governor of Arizona 2003–2009
 Jay Nixon, Governor of Missouri 2009–2017; Attorney General of Missouri 1993–2009
 George Noory. Radio talk show host
 Ed Rendell, Governor of Pennsylvania 2003–2011; Mayor of Philadelphia 1992–2000
 Kathleen Sebelius, United States Secretary of Health and Human Services 2009–2014; Governor of Kansas 2003–2009
 Paul Strauss, Shadow Senator from the District of Columbia since 1997
 Antonio Villaraigosa, Mayor of Los Angeles 2005–2013
 Tom Wolf, Governor of Pennsylvania since 2015; Secretary of Revenue of Pennsylvania 2007–2008

Declined
Individuals listed in this section were the focus of media speculation as being possible 2016 presidential candidates but publicly, and unequivocally, ruled out a presidential bid in 2016.

 Tammy Baldwin, U.S. Senator from Wisconsin since 2013; U.S. Representative from Wisconsin 1999–2013 
 Evan Bayh, U.S. Senator from Indiana 1999–2011; Governor of Indiana 1989–1997 (Endorsed Hillary Clinton)
 Michael Bennet, U.S. Senator from Colorado since 2009; Superintendent of Denver Public Schools 2005–2009 (Endorsed Hillary Clinton)
 Joe Biden, Vice President of the United States 2009–2017, U.S. Senator from Delaware 1973–2009; Democratic presidential candidate in 1988 and 2008
Michael Bloomberg, former Mayor of New York City (2002–2013) and founder of Bloomberg L.P.
 Cory Booker, U.S. Senator from New Jersey since 2013, Mayor of Newark, New Jersey 2006–2013 (Endorsed Hillary Clinton)
 Sherrod Brown, U.S. Senator from Ohio since 2007; U.S. Representative from Ohio 1993–2007; Secretary of State of Ohio 1983–1991 (Endorsed Hillary Clinton)
 Joaquín Castro, U.S. Representative from Texas since 2013 (Endorsed Hillary Clinton)
 Julian Castro, United States Secretary of Housing and Urban Development 2014–2017; Mayor of San Antonio, Texas 2009–2014
 George Clooney, actor and filmmaker from California
 Andrew Cuomo, Governor of New York 2011–2021; Attorney General of New York 2007–2010; U.S. Secretary of Housing and Urban Development 1997–2001
 Howard Dean,  Chairman of the Democratic National Committee 2005–2009; Governor of Vermont 1991–2003; presidential candidate in 2004 (Endorsed Hillary Clinton)
 Bill de Blasio, Mayor of New York City 2014-2021; New York City Public Advocate 2010–2013; New York City Councilman 2002–2009 (Endorsed Hillary Clinton)
 Rahm Emanuel, Mayor of Chicago 2011–2019; White House Chief of Staff 2009–2010; U.S. Representative from Illinois 2003–2009 (Endorsed Hillary Clinton)
 Al Franken, U.S. Senator from Minnesota 2009–2018 (Endorsed Hillary Clinton)
 Kirsten Gillibrand, U.S. Senator from New York since 2009; U.S. Representative from New York 2007–2009 (Endorsed Hillary Clinton)
 Martin Heinrich, U.S. Senator from New Mexico since 2013; U.S. Representative from New Mexico 2009–2013 (Endorsed Hillary Clinton)
 John Hickenlooper, Governor of Colorado 2011–2019; Mayor of Denver, Colorado 2003–2011
 Tim Kaine, U.S. Senator from Virginia since 2013; Governor of Virginia 2006–2010 (Endorsed Hillary Clinton and eventual Vice Presidential Nominee)
 John Kerry, United States Secretary of State 2013–2017; U.S. Senator from Massachusetts 1985–2013; presidential nominee in 2004
 Amy Klobuchar, U.S. Senator from Minnesota since 2007 (Endorsed Hillary Clinton)
 Dennis Kucinich, U.S. Representative from Ohio 1997–2013; presidential candidate in 2004, and 2008; Mayor of Cleveland, Ohio 1977–1979
 Dannel Malloy, Governor of Connecticut 2011–2019; Mayor of Stamford 1995–2011
 Joe Manchin, U.S. Senator from West Virginia since 2010, Governor of West Virginia 2005–2010 (Endorsed Hillary Clinton)
 Claire McCaskill, U.S. Senator from Missouri 2007–2019; Auditor of Missouri 1999–2007 (Endorsed Hillary Clinton)
 Chris Murphy, U.S. Senator from Connecticut since 2013; U.S. Representative from Connecticut 2007–2013  (Endorsed Hillary Clinton)
 Michelle Obama, First Lady of the United States 2009–2017
 Deval Patrick, Governor of Massachusetts 2007–2015
 Kasim Reed, Mayor of Atlanta, Georgia 2010–2018
 Robert Reich, United States Secretary of Labor 1993–1997 (Endorsed Bernie Sanders)
 Howard Schultz, Chairman and CEO of Starbucks 1988–2018 
 Brian Schweitzer, Governor of Montana 2005–2013 (Endorsed Martin O'Malley)
 Jeanne Shaheen, U.S. Senator from New Hampshire since 2009; Governor of New Hampshire 1997–2003 (Endorsed Hillary Clinton)
 Mark Warner, U.S. Senator from Virginia since 2009; Governor of Virginia 2002–2006 (Endorsed Hillary Clinton)
 Elizabeth Warren, U.S. Senator from Massachusetts since 2013; Special Advisor to the President 2010–2011

See also
 Political positions of the Democratic Party presidential primary candidates, 2016
 2016 United States presidential election timeline
 2016 Democratic National Convention

Candidates
 Republican Party presidential candidates, 2016
 United States third party and independent presidential candidates, 2016

Primaries
 Democratic Party presidential primaries, 2016
 Republican Party presidential primaries, 2016

General election polling
 Nationwide opinion polling for the United States presidential election, 2016
 Statewide opinion polling for the United States presidential election, 2016

Democratic primary polling
 Statewide opinion polling for the Democratic Party presidential primaries, 2016
 Nationwide opinion polling for the Democratic Party 2016 presidential primaries
 Democratic Party presidential debates, 2016

Republican primary polling
 Statewide opinion polling for the Republican Party presidential primaries, 2016
 Nationwide opinion polling for the Republican Party 2016 presidential primaries
 Republican Party presidential debates, 2016

Notes

References

External links

 
 2016 Presidential Form 2 Filers at the Federal Election Commission (FEC)

Democratic
 
candidates